Shenhua may refer to:

 Shenhua CTL, a planned coal liquefaction plant in Ningdong, Ningxia, China
 Shenhua Group, a state-owned coal mining and energy company in China
 China Shenhua Energy Company, subsidiary of Shenhua Group
 Ling Shenhua, a character from Sega's Shenmue video game series
 Shanghai Shenhua F.C., football team of Shanghai
 Shenhua (Black Lagoon), a character from the manga and anime series Black Lagoon
 The Myth (film), a 2005 Hong Kong action-fantasy-adventure film directed by Stanley Tong, starring Jackie Chan
 Shinhwa (신화/神話, Pinyin pronunciation), a popular South Korean boy band and hip hop group